Happy Suicide, Jim! is The Love Kills Theory's debut full length album that was released on January 9, 2007. It was published on Xemu Records, mixed by Martin Trum, engineered by Jim Sommers, and produced by Cevin Soling.

Overview
The album was recorded at The Loft, Cheektowaga, and Penny Lane in New York City. For one week that January the album peaked at number 162 on CMJs Top 200. The album was also #1 on KZMU and had a long run in the top 5 albums in Montreal. The song "Authenticity" was played and featured on the Public Radio Exchange.

Lyrics are written by Soling, who claims to be influenced by writers such as Guy Debord, founder of the Situationist International, and Aldous Huxley, author of Brave New World and Yellow Chrome. The album lyrics also focus on the "bio-genetic studies on the evolution of despair" and outline opposition to the instant gratification of consumer culture. The album cover and name are a reference to cult leader Jim Jones.

Track listing

Personnel
musicians
 Cevin Soling - vocals, guitar
 Bill Brandau - keyboards
 Jim Minics - guitar
 Darren Pilato - bass
 Jaron Stewart - drums

production
 Cevin Soling - Producer
 Martin Trum - Mixing
 Jim Sommers - Engineer

References

External links 

2007 albums